Hans-Dirk Bierling is a German politician of the Christian Democratic Union (CDU) and former member of the German Bundestag.

Life 
From 18 March to 2 October 1990, he was a member of the Volkskammer, where he was chairman of the CDU/DA parliamentary group's working group on German, foreign, defence and development policy. He was a member of the Committee on German Unity and the Committee on Foreign Affairs. After reunification he became a member of the German Bundestag in 1990. He was a member of the Committee on Foreign Affairs, various subcommittees and a member of the German Bundestag delegations to the NATO and OSCE Parliamentary Assemblies. He retired from politics in 2002.

References 

1944 births
Living people
Members of the Bundestag for Saxony
Members of the Bundestag 1998–2002
Members of the Bundestag 1994–1998
Members of the Bundestag 1990–1994
Members of the Bundestag for the Christian Democratic Union of Germany